Lorenzo Spada (died 1544) was a Roman Catholic prelate who served as Bishop of Calvi Risorta (1543–1544).

Biography
Lorenzo Spada was ordained a priest in the Order of Friars Minor Conventual.
On 1 June 1543, he was appointed by Pope Paul III as Bishop of Calvi Risorta. 
He served as Bishop of Calvi Risorta until his death in 1544.

References

External links and additional sources
 (for Chronology of Bishops) 
 (for Chronology of Bishops) 

16th-century Italian Roman Catholic bishops
1544 deaths
Bishops appointed by Pope Paul III
Conventual Franciscan bishops